Holy Redeemer High School is a high school of the Roman Catholic Diocese of Scranton. It is located in Wilkes-Barre, Pennsylvania, United States. It is currently the only Catholic high school in Luzerne County.

History
In January 2007, Bishop Joseph Martino announced the consolidation of four schools into a central Catholic high school for Luzerne County. On February 27, 2007, James J. Redington, then-principal of Seton Catholic High School in Pittston, was selected to be the first principal of the new Holy Redeemer High School.

The school opened on July 1, 2007. It is a consolidation of Bishop Hafey High School in Hazleton, Bishop Hoban High School in Wilkes-Barre, Bishop O'Reilly High School in Kingston, and Seton Catholic High School in Pittston. The school is housed in the former Bishop Hoban building. Holy Redeemer's team name is the Royals and its colors are red, white, and gold. Classes began in late August 2007. By fall of that year, its students and faculty had celebrated the first Opening Liturgy at St. Nicholas Church, the first Spirit Week, and the first Junior Ring Ceremony.

The school was not in session on February 28, 2008, because a majority of faculty members called in sick to protest the diocese's refusal to acknowledge a teachers' union. The following day, over 200 students conducted a walkout in support of the teachers and their position. The diocese did not accept the union's terms.

On April 29, 2008, the high school conducted their first official ceremony for the National Honor Society. Holy Redeemer's first prom and talent show were held in May 2008. Later that school year, the high school community celebrated their first senior awards ceremony and senior graduation.

The high school's first student government election was held on December 17, 2008. The first student body officers were: President Joseph Sebastianelli, Vice President Matthew Powell, Secretary Moses Sam, and Treasurer Robert Gawlas. 
 
In June 2010, the school's first principal, James Redington, retired. The assistant principal, Anita Sirak, succeeded him.

Principals of Holy Redeemer

Enrollment

Alma mater
Holy Redeemer,
Hail the red, white, and gold;
We are faith, hope, and love.
We are one from the many,
United and proud,
With courage from above.
In the Spirit of Christ,
Our story is told.
Our Redeemer sustains us
As our lives do unfold.
Loyal, united with pride do we hail;
We are Holy Redeemer Royals;
We are Holy Redeemer High.
(Music and Lyrics by Andrea Bogusko Yorkonis)

Activities

Anime Club
Band
Baseball
Basketball
Bowling Club
Cheerleading
Chess Club
Chorus
Color Guard
Cross Country
Diving
Field Hockey
Football
Forensics
French Club
Golf
Ice Hockey
J-Pop Singers
Latin Club
Mock Law
National Honor Society
Pro-Life Club
Royal Singers
Saint Michael's Society 
School Musical
Ski Club
Soccer
Softball
Spanish Club
Stage Crew
Student Leadership Council (student government) 
Swimming
Tennis
Track and Field
Volleyball
Wrestling
Yearbook Staff

Holy Redeemer School System

High school
Holy Redeemer High School, Wilkes-Barre

Elementary schools
Good Shepherd Academy, Kingston
Holy Family Academy, Hazleton
Holy Rosary Elementary School, Duryea
Saint Nicholas/Saint Mary Elementary School, Wilkes-Barre
Saint Jude Elementary School, Mountain Top
Wyoming Area Catholic Elementary School, Exeter

References

Educational institutions established in 2007
Schools in Luzerne County, Pennsylvania
2007 establishments in Pennsylvania
Buildings and structures in Wilkes-Barre, Pennsylvania
Catholic secondary schools in Pennsylvania